Corpus Christi Roman Catholic High School (formerly Lady Mary) is a voluntary aided Roman Catholic secondary school located in Lisvane, Cardiff, Wales. The school is co-educational and accepts children aged 11–16. Corpus Christi has traditionally performed well, with consistently good and above-average performance shown during inspections.

History 
Corpus Christi was founded in 1987, having originally been called Lady Mary High School. The school moved from Cyncoed Road to the current purpose-built school in 1995 following the old building becoming structurally unsound.

Lady Mary High School originally included its own Sixth Form college. However, the school does not have a sixth form so pupils go to St. David's Catholic College for further education and for some vocational courses at GCSE.

Structure

Size 
In 2015, there were 1042 students enrolled at the school, a slight increase on previous years. Most students come from one of six feeder primary schools in the wider Cardiff area, and the school can accept up to 215 students for each year group. The school is regularly oversubscribed, with places difficult to get for new Year 7 students, particularly for students not from one of the feeder schools.

References

External links 
 Corpus Christi Catholic High School

2009 Estyn Inspection Report

2015 Estyn Inspection Report

Secondary schools in Cardiff
Catholic secondary schools in the Archdiocese of Cardiff